Federal elections were held in Switzerland on 27 October 1963. The Social Democratic Party emerged as the largest party in the National Council, winning 53 of the 200 seats.

Results

National Council

By constituency

Council of the States
In several cantons the members of the Council of the States were chosen by the cantonal parliaments.

References

Swiss federal election
Federal election
Federal elections in Switzerland
Swiss federal election
Federal